Donald Kaberry, Baron Kaberry of Adel, MC, TD (18 August 1907 – 13 March 1991), known as Sir Donald Kaberry, 1st Baronet, from 1960 to 1983, was a Conservative Party politician in the United Kingdom. He served as a Member of Parliament (MP) for 33 years and was later a life peer.

Biography 
Donald Kaberry was the son of Abraham Kaberry. He was educated at Leeds Grammar School and became a solicitor (a partner in Ford and Warren, Leeds) and company director, becoming chairman of W.H. Baxter Ltd and E. Walker & Co Ltd. He served as a councillor on Leeds City Council 1930–50, except for his period of army service during World War II. He was eventually made an honorary Alderman of the City Council. He also served from 1974 as special trustee of the Leeds Teaching Hospitals and in 1976 was made a Deputy Lieutenant of the West Yorkshire metropolitan county.

Kaberry enlisted in the Royal Artillery and commanded a battery at Dunkirk, receiving a Mention in Despatches. The citation at National Archives indicates that the decoration was a Military Cross for "... a courageous example of calm leadership to all ranks." After the war he was, as lieutenant-colonel, president of the military governing board at Hamburg. In 1947 he was awarded the Territorial Decoration (TD).

Kaberry was Member of Parliament (MP) for Leeds North West from 1950 to 1983, preceding Dr. Keith Hampson. He was a member of the Speaker's panel of chairmen in the House of Commons and an assistant government whip from 1952 to 1955 and parliamentary secretary at the Board of Trade 1955. He served as Conservative Party Vice-Chairman Organisation, 1955–61, and chairman of the Association of Conservative Clubs in 1961. During his time as vice-chairman, he was in position to receive a note from future British Prime Minister Margaret Thatcher following the birth of her twin children informing him that Thatcher was interested in a "return to active politics."

Personal life 
He was created a baronet, of Adel cum Eccup in the City of Leeds, in 1960, and on his retirement from the House of Commons in 1983 he was made a life peer as Baron Kaberry of Adel, of Adel in the City of Leeds.

Kaberry married in 1940 Lily, daughter of Edmund Scott of Morley, West Yorkshire, by whom he had three sons.

Lord Kaberry of Adel was injured in the IRA bombing of London's Carlton Club in June 1990 and died in March 1991, aged 83. The life barony became extinct on his death while he was succeeded in the baronetcy by his son Christopher.

Legacy 
Kaberry appears as a character in The Long Walk to Finchley, on Margaret Thatcher's early career – he is played by Oliver Ford Davies.

References

Times Guide to the House of Commons, 1950, 1966 and 1979

External links 
 

1907 births
1991 deaths
20th-century British lawyers
Assassinated English politicians
Baronets in the Baronetage of the United Kingdom
British Army personnel of World War II
Conservative Party (UK) MPs for English constituencies
Kaberry of Adel
Councillors in Leeds
Deaths by improvised explosive device in England
English solicitors
English terrorism victims
Ministers in the Eden government, 1955–1957
Parliamentary Secretaries to the Board of Trade
People educated at Leeds Grammar School
People killed by the Provisional Irish Republican Army
Recipients of the Military Cross
Royal Artillery officers
Terrorism deaths in England
UK MPs 1950–1951
UK MPs 1951–1955
UK MPs 1955–1959
UK MPs 1959–1964
UK MPs 1964–1966
UK MPs 1966–1970
UK MPs 1970–1974
UK MPs 1974
UK MPs 1974–1979
UK MPs 1979–1983
20th-century English lawyers
Life peers created by Elizabeth II